Alpiniropa is a genus of very small air-breathing land snails, terrestrial pulmonate gastropod mollusks in the family Charopidae. Alpiniropa is a monotypic genus, meaning it contains only one species. Its sole species, Alpiniropa okeana, is endemic to Australia.

References

Gastropods of Australia
Gastropods described in 1947
Gastropods described in 2018
Taxonomy articles created by Polbot
Taxobox binomials not recognized by IUCN